Benjamin Cook (born 27 October 1997) is a speedway rider from Australia.

Speedway career 
Cook, placed fifth in the FIM Oceania Championship before signing for Poole Pirates during the SGB Championship 2020 season. However the season was cancelled but he retained his place for the SGB Championship 2021 season, which resulted in a highly successful season for the Pirates as they won the league and Knockout Cup double.

In 2022, he rode for the Poole Pirates again in the SGB Championship 2022. His form improved significantly and he was instrumental in helping Poole retain their League and knockout cup double crown. In 2023, he re-signed for Poole for the SGB Championship 2023 and signed for Peterborough Panthers for the SGB Premiership 2023.

Personal life
His brother is fellow professional rider Zach Cook.

References 

Living people
1997 births
Australian speedway riders
Peterborough Panthers riders
Poole Pirates riders
Sportsmen from New South Wales